Exastilithoxus hoedemani is a species of armored catfish endemic to Brazil where it occurs in the Maurauiá River.  This species grows to a length of  SL.

References
 

Ancistrini
Catfish of South America
Freshwater fish of Brazil
Endemic fauna of Brazil
Fish described in 1985